Oliver Platt (born January 12, 1960) is a Canadian-born American actor. He is known for his starring roles in many films such as  Flatliners (1990), Beethoven (1992), Indecent Proposal, The Temp, The Three Musketeers (all 1993), Executive Decision, A Time to Kill (both 1996), Dangerous Beauty, Bulworth, The Impostors, Dr. Dolittle (all 1998), Ready to Rumble, Gun Shy (both 2000), Don't Say a Word (2001), Zig Zag (2002), Pieces of April (2003), The Ice Harvest (2005), Martian Child (2007), Frost/Nixon (2008), Year One, 2012 (both 2009), Please Give, Love & Other Drugs (both 2010), X-Men: First Class, The Oranges (both 2011), Legends of Oz: Dorothy's Return (2013), Frank and Cindy and One More Time (both 2015). He has also appeared in numerous television series, including The West Wing, The Big C, and Fargo. Platt has been nominated for a Golden Globe Award, a Tony Award, two Screen Actors Guild Awards, and four Primetime Emmy Awards.

Family and early life

Family 
Platt was born in Windsor, Ontario, Canada, to American parents Sheila Maynard, a clinical social worker, and Nicholas Platt, a career diplomat who served as U.S. ambassador to Pakistan, Zambia, and the Philippines. His older brother, Adam Platt, is a New York magazine restaurant critic. They returned to the United States when Platt was three months old.

Platt's paternal great-grandfather was artist and architect Charles A. Platt, and his maternal great-grandparents were equestrian Arthur Scott Burden (of the industrialist Burden family) and socialite Cynthia Roche. Platt is also a great-great-grandson of General Robert Shaw Oliver (through his mother).

Platt's paternal great great-grandfather was diplomat and lawyer Joseph Hodges Choate. Choate was the most successful lawyer in New York City during the Gilded Age and was later appointed U.S. Ambassador to England by President William McKinley. His brother William Gardner Choate, who was also a prominent lawyer and federal judge, created Choate Rosemary Hall.

Early life 
Because of his father's career as a foreign service officer, much of Platt's childhood was spent in Asia and Washington, D.C. Platt attended twelve different schools, including the American School in Japan, and has said "Even now I find myself envying people who have neighborhoods and roots." Platt's family made frequent trips back to Washington, where they held Commanders season tickets. Platt is also a fan of the Boston Red Sox.

When he was nine years old, Platt and his family visited the Kennedy Center in Washington, where he watched a performance that helped inspire his acting career. "One of the performances that really made me want to be an actor started out with this probably 20-minute rambling, drunken monologue by this bum. And it was a young Morgan Freeman. I'll never forget it. This guy was just so riveting. He stood there on stage alone before the curtain went up, and he held this audience utterly rapt. Including myself, obviously." According to Platt, drama departments gave his childhood some stability, "It was something of a survival mechanism, in that it gave me a little subculture to plug into wherever I ended up. Kids need that. I certainly did."

Education 
Platt attended a progressive boarding school named Colorado Rocky Mountain School in Carbondale, Colorado.

Platt majored in drama at Tufts University, where he met and became close friends with Hank Azaria. He spent three years working in theatre in Boston, Massachusetts, which he said had a "wealth of serious amateur theatre at that time…I played many roles, and it was the best training I could have had." Platt travelled with Shakespeare and Company, based in Lenox, Massachusetts, touring schools to earn his Equity card, before moving to New York. Platt's early career involved Off-Broadway and regional theatre, and he appeared onstage with the New York Shakespeare Festival, Lincoln Center Theater, Manhattan Theatre Club and other companies across many genres. He obtained an agent while working at Manhattan Punch Line Theatre, and met actor Bill Murray at his cousin's Christmas party. Murray attended Platt's show and recommended Platt to director Jonathan Demme, who cast him in Married to the Mob in 1988. Platt attributes his breakthrough to appearing at the Punch Line Theater.

Career 
Platt makes his decisions about accepting acting roles based on the role being "different from what I just did...I do have to be interested in the role". After Married to the Mob, he appeared in Working Girl (1988), Flatliners (1990), Beethoven (1992), The Three Musketeers (1993), A Time to Kill (1996), Executive Decision (1996), and Bulworth (1998). In 1998 Platt and Stanley Tucci played two deadbeat actors who improvise with unsuspecting strangers in The Impostors. Tucci and Platt developed the characters while working on a play at Yale University in 1988, with Tucci later completing the screenplay and directing the film.

In 1999, Platt played the wealthy and eccentric crocodile enthusiast Hector in David E. Kelley's Lake Placid, alongside Bill Pullman and Bridget Fonda. Platt described Hector as "pretty abrasive and obnoxious at times, but, I hope, he has a way of growing on you. I think David originally thought of him as a great white hunter sort of guy, but when I signed on for the role he sort of wrote him in a different direction."

The short-lived drama Deadline provided Platt's first lead role on television. Created by Dick Wolf, who also created Law & Order, Deadline focused on the lives of newspaper journalists in New York City. Platt starred as Pulitzer Prize-winning columnist Wallace Benton, an "unlikely hero". The strong cast, which also included Bebe Neuwirth and Hope Davis, could not compensate for substandard writing and the series was soon canceled. After Deadline failure, Platt avoided work on television until he read a script for The West Wing and signed on for a guest role. He received an Emmy nomination for his portrayal of no-nonsense White House Counsel Oliver Babish, brought in during season two to compile a defense for President Bartlet and others who covered up his non-disclosure of multiple sclerosis.

His role in the television series Huff as Russell Tupper from 2004 to 2006 was well-received, especially by creator Bob Lowry, who said, "Oliver plays an alcoholic, drug-addicted, sexaholic, workaholic, womanizing misogynist who is adorable. I don't know any actor who could do that. I originally saw Russell as a blond stud, but when I saw what Oliver could do, I realized how much better, richer, and less predictable he was than my idea of the character ... Oliver is very committed to the idea that story and dialogue be character-driven and unique". Platt's work was nominated for two Emmy awards and a Golden Globe.

In 2005, Platt acted in Harold Ramis's film The Ice Harvest as an unhappy businessman with a trophy wife and two stepchildren who becomes involved with a friend who has stolen $2 million from a Mafia boss. He also played a lard merchant named Papprizzio in Lasse Hallström's Casanova, who competes with Casanova (Heath Ledger) for marriage to Francesca (Sienna Miller). Platt won the New York Film Critics Online Award for best supporting actor for his role in Casanova.

A Broadway production named Shining City was Platt's Broadway debut in 2006. The play was set in Dublin, and Platt's role was the tortured protagonist, John. Shining City director said, "There is one word to describe Oliver. It's 'humanity.' He's got that everyman quality. He's a contradictory human being with flaws and strengths. And he's loveable. He can simultaneously make you laugh and break your heart. Oliver has brought to the role of John what I expected and more: tremendous inventiveness and sensitivity." Platt visited Dublin to prepare for the role and ensure his performance was authentic. He was nominated for a Tony award for "Best Performance by a Leading Actor in a Play".

In 2007, Platt played the part of Yankees owner George Steinbrenner in the ESPN mini-series The Bronx Is Burning. Platt signed onto the project after John Turturro was confirmed as Billy Martin, because "This thing lives or dies by that portrayal ... I think it's great casting. God knows he has the intensity." Platt starred in the pilot episode of The Thick of It, a remake of the British show of the same name in 2007. The series was not picked up by ABC.

Platt starred as Nathan Detroit, alongside Lauren Graham as Miss Adelaide, in the Broadway revival of Guys and Dolls which began performances at the Nederlander Theatre on February 3, 2009, and officially opened on March 1, 2009. The production closed on June 14, 2009, after 113 performances.

Platt starred as White House Chief of Staff Carl Anheuser in Roland Emmerich's 2012, a disaster film released November 13, 2009.

In August 2010, he was cast in the role of "The Man in Black" in 2011's X-Men spin-off, X-Men: First Class, directed by Matthew Vaughn. In 2012, he starred in the romantic comedy The Oranges alongside Hugh Laurie and Leighton Meester and appeared in the action film Chinese Zodiac. He provided the voice of Wiser the Owl in the 2013 animated film Dorothy of Oz. He appeared in Miramax's 2016 supernatural thriller, The 9th Life of Louis Drax.

Personal life 
Platt married Mary Camilla Bonsal Campbell on September 12, 1992, at the First Congregational Church in Kittery, Maine. They have three children: Lily (born 1995), George (born 1997), and Clare (born 1999). As of 1998, Platt had an open airline ticket when filming so he could return home frequently because his family did not accompany him to filming locations. In a 1999 interview, he explained that he had chosen to focus on film and television rather than theater because of his family.

Platt has a home in North Haven, Maine.

Tufts University considered offering its Light on the Hill award to Platt in 2008, which is given to distinguished alumni. However, Platt was unable to return to the Tufts campus, and the 2008 award was instead given to Jeff Kindler, chief executive of pharmaceutical company Pfizer.

Filmography

Film

Television

Video games

References

External links

 
 
 
 Random Roles: Oliver Platt

1960 births
Living people
20th-century American male actors
21st-century American male actors
20th-century Canadian male actors
21st-century Canadian male actors
Alumni of the British American Drama Academy
American male film actors
American male stage actors
American male television actors
American School in Japan alumni
Canadian male film actors
Canadian male stage actors
Canadian male television actors
Canadian people of American descent
Male actors from Washington, D.C.
Male actors from Windsor, Ontario
People from North Haven, Maine
Tufts University School of Arts and Sciences alumni